Henner is both a surname and a given name. Notable people with the name include:

Surname:
 Christal Henner, American bridge player
 Jean-Jacques Henner (1829–1905), French painter
 Marilu Henner (born 1952), American actress and producer
 Mishka Henner (born 1976), French British artist

Given name:
 Henner Henkel (1915–1942), German tennis player
 Henner Hofmann (born 1950), Mexican cinematographer and scriptwriter